The 2000 World Jiu-Jitsu Championship was held at Tijuca Tênis Clube, Rio de Janeiro, Brazil on 12 July 2000. 

Among the various practitioners was Jay Dee Pen III also known as “BJ” Penn. Penn, a rookie and a native of Hawaii would go on to make history that night, being the first American black-belt to win a title from IBJJF Worlds.

Teams results 
Results by Academy

External links 
 World Jiu-Jitsu Championship

References 

World Jiu-Jitsu Championship